Peter Delorge (born 19 April 1980 in Sint-Truiden, Belgium) is a former professional footballer.

Career 
He played as a defensive midfielder and spent his whole career at Sint-Truidense.

Delorge played in 204 matches from 1998 to 2008 in the Jupiler League for STVV. Peter made the transition from provincial to national youth at the age of 17.  He won the land title with de Uefa's, and shot to the first team a year later.

Personal life 
His brother was footballer Kristof Delorge, who died young due to a brain tumor in 2021. His sons Mathias Delorge-Knieper and Lucas Delorge-Knieper, are footballer too. Lucas plays in the youth of Club Brugge KV and Mathias plays for Sint-Truidense V.V..

References

External links
 
 

Living people
1980 births
Belgian footballers
Association football midfielders
Belgium under-21 international footballers
Sint-Truidense V.V. players
Belgian Pro League players
Challenger Pro League players
People from Sint-Truiden
Footballers from Limburg (Belgium)